Adrian Younge Presents Venice Dawn: Something About April is a composition by American composer Adrian Younge. It was released on audio CD 6 December 2011 and on LP  (WPR013) on 6 January 2012, both by Wax Poetics Records.

After finishing the soundtrack for Black Dynamite, Younge revisited his earlier treatment of the 2000 EP Venice Dawn, mixing its more baroque sound with the gritty soul of Black Dynamite. The new full-length release is "a heavy, dark mix of psychedelic soul and cinematic instrumentals with hip-hop aesthetics, touching on influences from Morricone to King Crimson, Portishead to The Flamingos, Wu-Tang Clan to Otis Redding."

Track listing

Personnel
Credits are adapted from Allmusic.

Adrian Younge – electric bass, chimes, clarinet, clavinet, drums, Fender Rhodes, flute, guitar, electric guitar, fuzz guitar, rhythm guitar, Hammond B3, Hammond organ, harpsichord, electric harpsichord, keyboards, percussion, electric piano, upright piano, piccolo, alto saxophone, baritone saxophone, tenor saxophone, signal generator, sitar, electric sitar, synthesizer, tape echo, tremolo, vibraphone, viola, wah wah guitar, Wurlitzer piano
Michael Wait – guitar, fuzz guitar, rhythm guitar, percussion, tape echo, tremolo, wah wah guitar
Alfredo Fratti – guitar
Chris Garcia – electric bass
Jack Waterson – drums, timpani
Clinton Patterson – trumpet
Todd Simon – flugelhorn, trumpet

Michael Leonhart – mellophonium, trumpet
Dennis Coffey – guitar
Calibro 35 – guitar, rhythm guitar, percussion
Shawn Lee – guitar
Loren Oden – arranger, lead and background vocals
Rebecca Jordan – arranger, lead and background vocals
Darren Lee – arranger, lead and background vocals
Brooke Derosa – lead and background vocals
Tashai – lead and background vocals
Byron Minns – monologue
Dayvora Ortega – whimpering voices

References

2011 albums
Adrian Younge albums